is a 2022 Japanese animated post-apocalyptic film produced by Wit Studio. It is directed by Tetsurō Araki and written by Gen Urobuchi, and features character designs by Takeshi Obata and music composed by Hiroyuki Sawano. The film had early screenings at the Berlin International Film Festival on February 10, 2022. It was followed by its worldwide release on Netflix on April 28, 2022, before it was released theatrically in Japan in May. A manga adaptation of the film by Erubo Hijihara was serialized in Shōnen Jump+ from April 22 to May 23, 2022.

Plot
In the near future, the world is overcome by bubbles that break the laws of reality. An explosion at Tokyo Tower concentrates all the bubbles in Tokyo, but makes the city uninhabitable. Various young folk defy the restrictions, and live there anyway, using parkour tournaments as a means to barter and trade supplies. In one parkour team, the Blue Blazes, 18 year old Hibiki, is an exceptional parkour talent, but he avoids others due to a hearing ultrasensitivity. Tokyo Tower continues to be an impossible location to get to because of gravity anomalies.

One day, Hibiki attempts to climb the tower because he hears a woman's song, and believes he sees a boy there. He almost makes it, but ends up falling into the ocean, where his final exhale combines with some of the bubbles to make a young girl. She is clearly new to being a human, but learns quickly from others. Hibiki names her "Uta" ("Song") because she knows the song he hears in his head. Uta and Hibiki train parkour together, beating a team called the Morticians/Undertakers, however, in one final catch, when Uta touches Hibiki, her arm fades away into bubbles. Bubble activity starts up again, so the Tokyo residents need to flee. Uta goes to Tokyo Tower to stop it.  Hibiki goes to save her.

In the final scene they save each other, but Uta fades into bubbles as in the original fairy tale from Hans Christian Andersen: "The Little Mermaid." In her final breath, she tells Hibiki that he made it worth it for her to be human. With the bubbles gone, the citizens of Tokyo return and start to rebuild. The parkour teams continue their lives too. Whether real or imagined, in the end credits Hibiki is still continuing to do parkour and there is a bubble following him which could imply it is Uta.

Voice cast

Music
The film's score is composed by Hiroyuki Sawano. The opening theme song is "Bubble feat. Uta" performed by Eve, while the ending theme song is  performed by Riria (りりあ。), who voices Uta in the film.

Track listing

Reception
 

Bubble grossed $509,309 at the box office.

References

External links
  
 
 
 

2020s Japanese-language films
2022 anime films
2022 films
Animated films set in Tokyo
Anime films composed by Hiroyuki Sawano
Films based on The Little Mermaid
Films directed by Tetsurō Araki
Films with screenplays by Gen Urobuchi
Japanese animated fantasy films
Japanese animated feature films
Japanese disaster films
Japanese-language Netflix original films
Netflix original anime
Parkour in film
Tokyo Tower in fiction
Warner Bros. animated films
Wit Studio